Salal is a town in Chad, lying   north of N'Djamena on the road to Faya-Largeau. Salal is the second largest city after Moussoro in Bahr el Gazel Region.

A garrison was once at Salal during the conflict with Libya in 1978. On 15 April 1978, FROLINAT forces, led by Goukouni Oueddei, took Salal before marching south to the Chadian capital, N'Djamena.

Demographics

References

Bahr el Gazel Region
Populated places in Chad